Steven Da Costa, sometimes written as Steven Dacosta (born 23 January 1997) is a French karateka. He won the gold medal in the men's 67 kg event at the 2020 Summer Olympics held in Tokyo, Japan. He is also a two-time gold medalist in the men's 67 kg event at the World Karate Championships (2018 and 2021) and a two-time gold medalist in this event at the European Karate Championships (2016 and 2019).

Career 

At the 2015 European Games held in Baku, Azerbaijan, he won the silver medal in the men's kumite 67 kg event. In the final, he lost against Burak Uygur of Turkey.

In 2016, he won the silver medal in the under-21 men's 67 kg event at the EKF Cadet, Junior and under-21 Championships held in Limassol, Cyprus. A few months later, he won the gold medal in the men's kumite 67 kg event at the European Karate Championships held in Montpelier, France. He also won the gold medal in the men's team kumite event. At the World University Karate Championships held in Braga, Portugal, he won the gold medal in the men's kumite 67 kg event. A few months later, at the World Karate Championships held in Linz, Austria, he won one of the bronze medals in both the men's kumite 67 kg and men's team kumite events.

In 2017, he won the silver medal in the men's team kumite event at the European Karate Championships held in İzmit, Turkey. In the same year, at the World Games held in Wrocław, Poland, he won the gold medal in the men's kumite 67 kg event. In the final, he defeated Jordan Thomas of Great Britain. At the 2018 World Karate Championships held in Madrid, Spain, he won the gold medal in the men's 67 kg event. In the final, he defeated Vinícius Figueira of Brazil. The following year, he also won the gold medal in the men's kumite 67 kg event at the 2019 European Karate Championships held in Guadalajara, Spain.

In May 2021, he won one of the bronze medals in the men's kumite 67 kg event at the European Karate Championships held in Poreč, Croatia. In August 2021, he represented France at the 2020 Summer Olympics in Tokyo, Japan. He won the gold medal by defeating Eray Şamdan of Turkey in the final of the men's 67 kg event. He was also the flag bearer for France during the closing ceremony. In November 2021, he won the gold medal in the men's 67 kg event at the World Karate Championships held in Dubai, United Arab Emirates.

He won one of the bronze medals in the men's 67 kg event at the 2022 European Karate Championships held in Gaziantep, Turkey. He also won the gold medal in the men's team kumite event.

Personal life 

His brothers Logan Da Costa and Jessie Da Costa also compete in karate.

Achievements

References

External links 

 
 

Living people
1997 births
French male karateka
European Games silver medalists for France
European Games medalists in karate
Karateka at the 2015 European Games
Competitors at the 2017 World Games
World Games gold medalists
World Games medalists in karate
French people of Portuguese descent
Olympic karateka of France
Karateka at the 2020 Summer Olympics
Medalists at the 2020 Summer Olympics
Olympic medalists in karate
Olympic gold medalists for France
21st-century French people